The sixth season of the American competitive television series BattleBots premiered on ABC on June 21, 2015.

In February 2015, ABC announced that it was reviving the series after a thirteen-year hiatus, which would feature a 16-team single-elimination tournament.

Former UFC fighter Kenny Florian and MLB/NFL Sportscaster Chris Rose hosted, Faruq Tauheed acted as the arena announcer, and Alison Haislip was the sideline and behind the scenes reporter.  Molly McGrath was the presenter.

Robots in season 6 competed in one 250-pound weight class, as opposed to the multiple weight classes in seasons 1–5.

Contestants

This season sees teams from only two countries competing with their robots. Five from the United Kingdom and the rest from the United States.  Competitors from the US hail from five different states, including fourteen from California.

Qualifying

There were a total of 28 robots. Bull Dog, Chronic, Splatter, and Counter Revolution were entered as reserve bots; of these, only Counter Revolution was chosen to compete, after Beta had to forfeit due to technical problems, but Beta was able to return for the 2016 season.

 The robot was the winner of the battle and moved on to the Round of 16.
 The robot was chosen as a "Wildcard" pick and moved on to the Round of 16.
 The robot was the loser of the battle and was eliminated.

Bracket Phase

Seedings
Tombstone
Icewave
Bite Force
Bronco
Stinger
Lock-Jaw
Warrior Clan
Overdrive
Witch Doctor*
Ghost Raptor
Overhaul*
Warhead*
Plan X
Hypershock
Chomp*
Radioactive

* = Robots that were awarded a Wildcard

Round of 16

 The robot was the winner of the battle and moved on to the Quarterfinals.
 The robot was the loser of the battle and was eliminated.

Quarter-finals
The quarterfinals in this single-elimination tournament will see four robots move on to the semi-finals.

 The robot was the winner of the battle and moved on to the Semifinals.
 The robot was the loser of the battle and was eliminated.

Semi-finals and Championship
The semi-finals and finals in this single-elimination tournament will see a champion bestowed with the BattleBots Giant Nut. A non-tournament rumble took place in episode 6 alongside the semi-finals and finals.

Non-Tournament Rumble

 The robot was the winner of the battle.
 The robot was the loser of the battle and was eliminated.
 The robot was the winner of the battle and became the champion of BattleBots 2015.

Episodes

The season ended averaging 4.59 million viewers.

References

BattleBots
2015 American television seasons